The 2012 Open Sud de France was a men's tennis tournament played on indoor hard courts. It was the 25th edition of the Open Sud de France, and was part of the ATP World Tour 250 Series of the 2012 ATP World Tour. It took place at the Arena Montpellier in Montpellier, France, from January 28 to February 5, 2012. It was the first edition to be held in January and the second held in Montpellier.

Singles main draw entrants

Seeds

 Rankings as of January 16, 2012

Other entrants
The following players received wildcards into the singles main draw:
  Nikolay Davydenko
  Paul-Henri Mathieu
  Guillaume Rufin

The following players received entry from the qualifying draw:
  Roberto Bautista-Agut 
  Marc Gicquel
  Florent Serra
  Maxime Teixeira

Doubles main draw entrants

Seeds

 Rankings are as of January 16, 2012

Other entrants
The following pairs received wildcards into the doubles main draw:
  Kenny de Schepper /  Fabrice Martin
  Gaël Monfils /  Daryl Monfils

The following pair received entry as alternates:
  Nikolay Davydenko /  Igor Kunitsyn

Withdrawals
  Feliciano López (injury)

Finals

Singles

 Tomáš Berdych defeated  Gaël Monfils, 6–2, 4–6, 6–3
It was Berdych's 1st title of the year and 7th of his career.

Doubles

 Nicolas Mahut  /  Édouard Roger-Vasselin defeated  Paul Hanley /  Jamie Murray, 6–4, 7–6(7–4)

External links and references

Official website